is a Japanese football player for Tokyo Verdy.

Club statistics
Updated to 23 February 2017.

References

External links

Profile at Tokyo Verdy

1994 births
Living people
People from Mitaka, Tokyo
Association football people from Tokyo Metropolis
Japanese footballers
J2 League players
Japan Football League players
Tokyo Verdy players
Verspah Oita players
FC Imabari players
Association football midfielders